Cache Creek is a small creek in Cotton County, Oklahoma and a tributary of the Red River.

Cache Creek has three primary tributaries East Cache Creek, West Cache Creek, and Deep Red Creek.

East Cache Creek
The creek routes to the Cache Creek basin located southwest of Temple, Oklahoma.

Elmer Thomas Lake, Lake Ellsworth, Lake Lawtonka, Little Medicine Creek, Medicine Creek, Snake Creek, and Soldier Creek are tributaries of East Cache Creek.

West Cache Creek
The creek routes to the Cache Creek basin located southwest of Temple, Oklahoma.

Gramma Lake, Comanche Lake, Kiowa Lake, French Lake, Fish Lakes, Lost Lake, Quanah Parker Lake, Crater Lake, Canyon Lake, Crater Creek, Blue Beaver Creek, Lake Rush, Lake Jed Johnson, Ketch Lake, Pecan Creek, and Sandy Creek are tributaries of West Cache Creek.

Deep Red Creek

Lake Frederick and Little Deep Red Creek are tributaries of Deep Red Creek.

Discharges

Stream Water & Watershed Data

See also
 Cache, Oklahoma
 Robinsons Landing Marina
 Wichita Mountains
 Wichita Mountains Wildlife Refuge

References

External links
 
 
 
 
 
 
 

Bodies of water of Comanche County, Oklahoma
Bodies of water of Cotton County, Oklahoma
Rivers of Oklahoma
Tributaries of the Red River of the South